Direct Democracy is a Polish political party founded in 2012. Its goal is to change the Polish political system by moving it closer to the political concept of direct democracy.

The party's creation has been inspired by the 2012 protests against ACTA.

References
Direct Democracy Party in Poland
Eurostart e-polityków, rp.pl, Wiktor Ferfecki 15-01-2014

External links
Homepage

2012 establishments in Poland
Direct democracy parties
E-democracy
Political parties established in 2012
Political parties in Poland
Populist parties
Progressive parties
Regionalist parties